The Dancer from Tanagra is a 1920 German silent film directed by Heinz Paul and starring Fritz Alten, Hella Moja and Josef Reithofer.

Cast
 Fritz Alten as Bildhauer Avardos
 Hella Moja as Mündel Praxedis
 Josef Reithofer as Piero Bacistini
 Richard Georg
 Henri Peters-Arnolds

External links 
 

1920 films
Films of the Weimar Republic
German silent feature films
1920s German-language films
Films directed by Heinz Paul
German black-and-white films
Terra Film films
1920s German films